The 1941–42 Oshkosh All-Stars season was the All-Stars' fourth year in the United States' National Basketball League (NBL), which was also the fourth year the league existed. Seven teams competed in the NBL in 1941–42 and the league did not use divisions.

The All-Stars played their home games at South Park School Gymnasium. For the fifth consecutive season, the All-Stars finished the season with either a division or league best record (20–4). They then went on to win their second consecutive league championship by defeating the Fort Wayne Zollner Pistons, two games to one in a best-of-three series.

Head coach Lon Darling won the league's Coach of the Year Award. Players Leroy Edwards and Charley Shipp earned First Team All-NBL honors for the second straight season.

Roster

Note: Herm Witasek was not on the playoffs roster

Regular season

Season standings

Playoffs

Semifinals
(1) Oshkosh All-Stars vs. (4) Indianapolis Kautskys: Oshkosh wins series 2–0
Game 1 @ Indianapolis: Oshkosh 40, Indianapolis 33
Game 2 @ Oshkosh: Oshkosh 64, Akron 48

NBL Championship
(1) Oshkosh All-Stars vs. (2) Fort Wayne Zollner Pistons: Oshkosh wins series 2–1
Game 1 @ Fort Wayne: Fort Wayne 61, Oshkosh 43
Game 2 @ Oshkosh: Oshkosh 68, Fort Wayne 60
Game 3 @ Oshkosh: Oshkosh 52, Fort Wayne 46

Awards and honors
 NBL Coach of the Year – Lon Darling
 First Team All-NBL – Leroy Edwards and Charley Shipp

References

Oshkosh All-Stars seasons
Oshkosh
National Basketball League (United States) championship seasons
Oshkosh All-Stars
Oshkosh All-Stars